Brozville is an unincorporated community in Holmes County, Mississippi, United States. A post office operated under the name Brozville from 1895 to 1906.

References

Unincorporated communities in Holmes County, Mississippi
Unincorporated communities in Mississippi